Luis Alberto Ayala Salinas  (born 18 September 1932) is a former Chilean tennis player who competed in the 1950s and 1960s.

Amateur
He was twice a singles runner-up at the French Championships. In 1958 he was seeded fifth and reached the final after a victory against first-seeded and world No. 1 Ashley Cooper in the semifinal. In the final, however, he was defeated in straight sets by Mervyn Rose while in 1960 he lost the final in five sets to Nicola Pietrangeli. Together with Thelma Coyne Long, he won the mixed doubles title at the 1956 French Championships. 

Ayala won the Gold Medal at the 1959 Pan American Games in Chicago, beating Canadian Robert Bédard in the final.

Ayala won the prestigious singles title at the Italian Open in 1959, defeating Pietrangeli in the semifinal and Neale Fraser in the final, both matches in four sets. The following year, 1960, he again reached the Italian final but lost in five sets to Barry MacKay.

Ayala won the 1960 Argentina Championships at Buenos Aires on clay, defeating Ron Holmberg in the semifinal in three straight sets, and Manuel Santana in the final in five close sets.
He won the 1960 Madrid Championships on clay, defeating Andres Gimeno in the final in four sets.
Ayala won the 1961 Hanover Championships on clay, defeating Ramanathan Krishnan in the final in five sets.

Ayala was ranked world No. 5 for 1958 by Lance Tingay of The Daily Telegraph (and No. 6 for 1959, No. 7 for 1960 and 1961).

Professional
In 1961 Ayala turned professional and joined Jack Kramer's tour.
In 1964, he won the La Baule Professional Championships on clay, defeating Rod Laver in the semifinal and Lew Hoad in the four-set final.
When he retired, he became a tennis professional at River Oaks Country Club in Houston, Texas. Currently, he is the director of tennis at the Forest Club in Houston, Texas.

Davis Cup
Between 1952 and 1960 Ayala played in 18 ties for the Chilean Davis Cup team and compiled a record of 37 wins and 14 losses. During this period the best performance was reaching the semifinal of the Europe zone in 1955 which they lost to Sweden, despite Ayala winning both his singles matches against Lennart Bergelin and Sven Davidson.

Grand Slam finals

Singles (2 runners-up)

Mixed doubles: (1 title, 2 runner-up)

References

External links
 
 
 
 Forest Club bio

Chilean expatriates in the United States
Chilean male tennis players
French Championships (tennis) champions
Tennis players from Houston
Tennis players from Santiago
Chilean people of Basque descent
Tennis players at the 1955 Pan American Games
Tennis players at the 1959 Pan American Games
Pan American Games gold medalists for Chile
Pan American Games bronze medalists for Chile
1932 births
Living people
Grand Slam (tennis) champions in mixed doubles
Professional tennis players before the Open Era
Pan American Games medalists in tennis
20th-century Chilean people